Endure may refer to:
 Endure (Assemblage 23 album)
 Endure (Special Interest album)